Drapetisca alteranda is a spider in the family Linyphiidae. It is found in the United States. This species can be found in leaves on the ground, however it is most often found on the surface of various deciduous and coniferous trees.

References

Spiders described in 1909
Spiders of the United States
Linyphiidae